Peter Stantor (died 1415), of Ebbesbourne Wake, Wiltshire, was an English politician.

He was a Member (MP) of the Parliament of England for Wiltshire in January 1404.

References

14th-century births
1415 deaths
English MPs January 1404
Members of the Parliament of England (pre-1707) for Wiltshire